This is a list of places on the Victorian Heritage Register in the City of Greater Shepparton in Victoria, Australia. The Victorian Heritage Register is maintained by the Heritage Council of Victoria.

The Victorian Heritage Register, as of 2021, lists the following ten state-registered places within the City of Greater Shepparton:

References 

Greater Shepparton
+
+